The Oxyrhynchus Papyri 159 through 207 are the 48 papyri published by Bernard Pyne Grenfell and Arthur Surridge Hunt in summary form at the end of the first volume of their monumental collection of documents recovered from Oxyrhynchus beginning in 1896.  Many of these 48 were later examined and published in more detail, some by Grenfell and Hunt themselves, and some by other Egyptologists and scholars.

See also
 Oxyrhynchus Papyri

References

159